Jean H. Godden (born October 10, 1931) was a member of the Seattle City Council, first elected in 2003 and re-elected in 2007 and 2011. Council member Godden served three terms and conceded her seat to Rob Johnson in the 2015 election. She chaired the Libraries, Utilities, and Center Committee and the Special Committee on Alaskan Way Viaduct and Seawall Replacement Project and Central Waterfront Planning. She was also Vice Chair of the Parks and Neighborhood Committee and was a member of the Transportation Committee. Jean also was an alternate on the Parks and Seattle Center Committee.

Godden received her bachelor's degree in editorial journalism from the University of Washington in 1973 and was elected a member of Phi Beta Kappa. Her local fame is due to her award-winning column in The Seattle Times newspaper, which she gave up to run for City Council.

Godden won reelection to the Council in 2007. She defeated her challenger Joe Szwaja in the November election by winning 71.21 percent of the vote.

Godden conceded her seat in the election of 2015, during the council’s first district elections in recent times.

Biography

Born in Connecticut, Godden's family moved many times before she graduated from high school in Virginia due to her father's job as a surveyor.

After two Seattle school levies failed and her son's kindergarten class disappeared, Godden and other parents mobilized and she ended up as PTA president. Godden then joined the League of Women Voters; Citizens Against Freeways; the Municipal League; and the United Way, where she helped to organize the Lake City Community Council, wrote its bylaws and served as one of its first directors.

In the late 1960s Seattle Mayor Wes Uhlman appointed Godden to his charter review committee. She was also named to the City's Board of Adjustment.

Godden attained celebrity status in Seattle as a columnist for both daily newspapers, first for the Seattle Post-Intelligencer and most recently for The Seattle Times. Godden reached that status after years working in other positions with the paper, including as a business editor, editorial page editor, real estate and urban affairs reporter and restaurant critic.  Godden was one of the P-I's early female staff members and one of two women in her class at Northwestern University's Medill School of Journalism. She would eventually graduate from the University of Washington's School of Communications.  She started her newspaper career at the University District Herald as a 19-year-old, joined the P-I in 1974 as a temporary staffer, had her first column published in the P-I in 1983, and finally switched to The Seattle Times in 1991.

Godden has two sons, Glenn and Jeff, and two grandsons, Chris Godden and Matthew Godden and one great-grandson and three great-granddaughters, Joshua Godden, Raevyn Godden, Calla Godden, and Sloane Godden. She resides in Seattle's View Ridge neighborhood.

2007 Campaign

In the August primary, Godden faced opposition from three challengers: Joe Szwaja, Lauren Briel and Robert Sondheim.

She significantly out-fundraised all of her opponents. According to Seattle Ethics and Elections reports, Godden had raised $189,189 as of August 27. Her closest challenger, Szwaja, had raised just over $56,000; as of September 28, 2007, Godden had generated $200,375 in campaign funding.

In the August 21 primary, Godden advanced to the general election, beating her nearest challenger by more than 30 percentage points.

Primary election results

2011 Election
Godden was opposed for re-election to the council by Bobby Forch, a city transportation manager. The campaign was competitive, and fellow council member Mike O'Brien even endorsed Forch over Godden. Some speculated that age may have factored into the election as well, with Godden being 80 at the time. However Godden was re-elected to a third term on the council, capturing 54% of the vote.

2015 Election
In the election of 2015 for the first time, seven of the city council seats were decided by geographic representation. Godden was opposed in her race for the newly created District 4 seat by opponents Rob Johnson, a transit advocate, and Michael Maddux, a parks activist. Godden conceded on August 6, and Rob Johnson was eventually elected to the seat.

References

1931 births
Living people
Seattle City Council members
Medill School of Journalism alumni
University of Washington College of Arts and Sciences alumni
Women city councillors in Washington (state)
21st-century American politicians
21st-century American women politicians